Émile Dubois may refer to:

Émile Dubois (murderer) (1867–1907), French-born serial killer in Chile
Émile Dubois (cyclist), French cyclist and sprinter
Émile-Jules Dubois (1853–1904), French doctor and politician
Jacques-Émile Dubois (1920–2005), French chemist
Émile Fernand-Dubois (1869–1952), Belgian sculptor and medallist
Émile Dubois (politician) (1913–1973), French politician